Gertrude Lilian Elles MBE (8 October 1872 – 18 November 1960) was a British geologist, known for her work on graptolites.

Personal life 
Gertrude Elles was born on October 8, 1872. She was the youngest of six children. Every year the Elles family would travel to the Morenish Estate near Killen to hunt. The young Gertrude fell in love with Scotland, especially the Highlands, during these family vacations. Elles' love for geology evolved through exploration of the outdoors, museum visits, and fieldtrips. Her first introduction to a formal education in geology were classes she took in 1887 at Wimbledon High School which she attended. Dr. Elles' adult life is marked by her dedication to the contribution of knowledge to the field of Geology. She was a trailblazer for women in field and an influential model for young female researchers. Her work accrued international acclaim in her lifetime and beyond it. Dr. Elles remained unmarried but maintained a connection to her family and visited frequently in Scotland. In the last 35 years of her life she became increasingly deaf. She moved back to Scotland, where she died in 1960.

Higher education 
Gertrude Elles attended Newnham College, University of Cambridge in 1891 to study Natural Sciences. There she met three other students: Ethel Skeat, Margaret Crosfield, and Ethel Wood with whom she collaborated throughout her career. In 1895, she passed her examinations for a BA honors in Natural Sciences and graduated with First Class Honours. At the time, Oxford and Cambridge refused to grant degrees to women so she did not receive a formal degree until 1905. In 1905, the Universities of Cambridge and Oxford and Trinity College, Dublin allowed women to receive their degrees ad eundem from the University of Dublin. During her time at Cambridge, Elles was involved in the leadership of Sedgwick club, the University's official geological society. She was one of the first three female members of the club and remained a member of the club till she passed away.

Career 
Elles was a field geologist, stratigrapher and paleontologist. Her work concerned the interpretation of graptolite zones of Lower Paleozoic strata. In the late 1890s, she worked with Ethel Wood on the preparation of British Graptolites, a monograph that was produced in parts over the next twenty years under the general editorship of Professor Charles Lapworth. The monograph was completed in 1918 and is still referenced for graptolite research today. In 1922, further work on the analysis of evolutionary patterns in graptolites by Elles was published by the Geologists' Association under the title: The graptolite faunas of the British Isles: A study in evolution. Her work on the taxonomy and evolution of graptolites, using material from North Wales and the Skiddaw Slates of the Lake District, England, and from the Wenlock Shales of the Welsh borders, was of fundamental importance. Elles was one of the first geologists to look at not individual specimens of fossils but at the concept of communities of organisms. Although Elles is known for her research on graptolites she also conducted research and published numerous works on the stratigraphy of the Lower Palaeozoic, using graptolites as a tool to delineate time zones. In 1933 she published, ‘The stratigraphy and faunal succession in the Ordovician rocks of the Builth–Llandrindod inlier, Radnorshire’. 

Elles, who pioneered female education, was a life member of the British Federation of University Women. Given that she worked in a field of research where men predominated, she welcomed the opportunities it afforded her to interact with other women. She routinely attended the Cambridge branch of the Federation, where she met several of her geology acquaintances, and she represented the organization at national gatherings. She was able to increase her network and influence among intellectually comparable women because of this involvement.

She became Vice-principal of Newnham College in 1930. She continued to lecture and research until her retirement in 1938. She was made Reader Emeritus in 1938, and continued to supervise students.

Legacy 
In 2018, the Paleontological Association introduced ‘The Gertrude Elles Award’ to promote high-quality engagement in the field of paleontology. The president of the Association said the following about the graptolite monograph (which could be regarded as her paramount legacy): "The work was encyclopedic in its coverage of the group and beautifully illustrated, with Elles working on the text and Wood focusing on the illustrations. With the taxonomy standardized, a detailed biozonal scheme could be established and that, in turn, enabled the global correlation of Lower Palaeozoic rocks. The work, almost invariably referred to simply as ‘Elles & Wood’, continues to be a benchmark and standard reference tool a century later." 

In May of 1904 Elles’ paper on “The Highland loch” gained the attention of six female students; three as members of Sedgwick club (Miss Slater, Miss Drew, and Miss Pennycuick) and three were guests (Miss Craske, Miss Caulkin, and Miss J.M. Slater). he Combination Room at Newnham College served as the venue for the meeting. Interestingly, several club meetings took place in spaces that were seen as masculine spaces. At a time when Victorian society forbade the open mixing of the sexes, this was undoubtedly exceptional. Elles was there and may have served as a chaperone. As a participant, Miss Robertson was also present. It would have been challenging for the women to attend a lecture in a private male residence without Elles being present. This was a stepping stone for a lot of the female researchers as it made them more confident to be in mixed-gender spaces.

Elles' excellence as a teacher is also notable. She was a great lecturer and was able to foster engagement in her courses. "One of her students commented: ‘She was a very stimulating teacher, and not only of members of the College – she was in great demand. She taught geological mapping in the Sedgwick: everybody went to that. She was marvelously clear and very, very fierce'" .’Some of the students that she supervised and mentored at Cambridge had significant careers in geology themselves including Dorothy Hill, Elizabeth "Betty" Ripper and Oliver Bulman. Dorothy Hill was the first female professor at an Australian university and first female president; Betty Ripper, worked on Australian graptolites and stromatoporoids; and Oliver Bulman, became the Woodwardian Professor of Geology in Cambridge".

Awards and honours 

 First Class Honours degree in Natural Science Tripos from Cambridge in 1895 
 Awarded the Lyell Fund of the Geological Society of London in 1900 for her work on graptolites
 She received DSc at Trinity College Dublin in 1905.
 In 1919 she became one of the first female Fellows of the Geological Society, and in the same year won its Murchison Medal.
 She was awarded an MBE in 1920 for work with the Red Cross during the First World War.
 She was president of the British Association in 1923.
 First woman to be awarded a readership position at Cambridge in 1924.

Publications
The publications resulting from her research on graptolites were brought together in a book:
Elles, G. L. & Wood, E. M. R. 1901–1918. Monograph of British Graptolites. Parts 1– 11. Paleontological Society, London, Monographs, 1 – 539

Other papers that she authored or co-authored include:
Elles, G. L. 1909. The relation of the Ordovician and Silurian rocks of Conway (North Wales). Quarterly Journal of the Geological Society, London, 65, 169–194.
Elles, G. L. 1922. The graptolite faunas of the British Isles. Proceedings of the Geologists' Association, 33, 168–200
Elles, G. L. 1922. The Bala country: its structure and rock succession. Quarterly Journal of the Geological Society, London, 78, 132–175.
Elles, G. L. & Slater, I. L. 1906. The highest Silurian rocks of the Ludlow district. Quarterly Journal of the Geological Society, London, 62, 195– 221.
Elles, G. L. & Wood, E. M. R. 1895. Supplementary notes on Drygill Shales. Geological Magazine, 2, 216–249.
Elles G. L. (1904). Some graptolite zones in the arenig rocks of wales. Geological magazine.
Elles G. L. (1931). The study of geological maps. (second edition.).
Strachan I. Elles G. L. & Wood E. M. R. (1971). A synoptic supplement to "a monograph of british graptolites by miss g.l. elles and miss e.m.r. wood". Palaeontographical Society.
Elles G. L. (1898). Collected papers. Retrieved December 11 2022 from http://catalog.hathitrust.org/api/volumes/oclc/25765694.html.

References

External links 
 Gertrude Elles Biography
 

1872 births
1960 deaths
Alumni of Newnham College, Cambridge
Members of the Order of the British Empire
Fellows of the Geological Society of London
British women in World War I
British women geologists
Lyell Medal winners
Presidents of the British Science Association
Steamboat ladies